The 1996 Hemsworth by-election was a parliamentary by-election held in England on 1 February 1996 for the House of Commons constituency of Hemsworth in West Yorkshire.

The vacancy was caused by the death of Hemsworth's Member of Parliament (MP), Derek Enright of the Labour Party. Enright, a former Member of the European Parliament (MEP) for Leeds, had held the seat since a by-election in 1991.

The result was a Labour hold.

The election saw the first contest by the Socialist Labour Party, ahead of the party's official formation.  Based in nearby Barnsley, the organisation saved its deposit, with 5.4% of the vote.

See also
Lists of United Kingdom by-elections
1934 Hemsworth by-election
1946 Hemsworth by-election
1991 Hemsworth by-election

References

External links
Campaign literature from the by-election

Hemsworth by-election
Hemsworth by-election
By-elections to the Parliament of the United Kingdom in West Yorkshire constituencies
Elections in Wakefield
1990s in West Yorkshire
Hemsworth by-election
Hemsworth